We Are the World is a 1985 album that contains USA for Africa's "We Are the World", a superstar charity recording for famine relief efforts in Ethiopia. The album was released on April 23, 1985, by Columbia Records.

In addition to the title track, the album includes nine previously unreleased songs by donating artists, including Prince, Steve Perry, Chicago, Bruce Springsteen and the E Street Band (a rendition of Jimmy Cliff's obscure "Trapped" recorded live at Meadowlands Arena on their Born in the U.S.A. Tour, which achieved considerable album-oriented rock radio airplay and topped the Mainstream Rock chart), Tina Turner and others.

The album also includes another famine relief fundraising song, "Tears Are Not Enough", which was performed by Canadian supergroup Northern Lights.

Prince and The Revolution recorded "4 the Tears in Your Eyes" for the album. A rare live version of the song, done for Live Aid, was included on Prince's The Hits/The B-Sides.

Chicago's contribution, "Good for Nothing", would be the last single released with bass player Peter Cetera's lead vocals before he left the band.  It was later included on the band's comprehensive 2003 compilation, The Box.

The album was nominated for the Grammy Award for Album of the Year in 1986.

Reception

The album sold over three million copies. According to Billboard on April 27, 1985, it reached number one in only two weeks, something only formerly accomplished by The Beatles and The Rolling Stones.

Track listing
Side one
USA for Africa – "We Are the World" (Michael Jackson, Lionel Richie) – 7:02
Steve Perry – "If Only for the Moment, Girl" (Randy Goodrum, Steve Perry) – 3:44
The Pointer Sisters – "Just a Little Closer" (Robbie Nevil, Mark Mueller) – 3:53
Bruce Springsteen & The E Street Band – "Trapped" (Live Version) (Jimmy Cliff) – 5:11

Side two
Northern Lights – "Tears Are Not Enough" (David Foster, Bryan Adams, Jim Vallance) – 4:21
Prince & The Revolution – "4 the Tears in Your Eyes" (Prince) – 2:45
Chicago – "Good for Nothing" (Richard Marx, Robert Lamm, David Foster) – 3:35
Tina Turner – "Total Control" (Martha Davis, Jeff Jourard) – 3:38
Kenny Rogers – "A Little More Love" (Thom Schuyler, J. Fred Knobloch) – 2:54
Huey Lewis and the News – "Trouble in Paradise" (Live Version) (Johnny Colla, Bill Gibson, Chris Hayes, Sean Hopper, Huey Lewis, Mario Cipollina) – 4:34

Charts

Weekly charts

Year-end charts

Certifications and sales

Production credits
 Executive Producer: Ken Kragen
 Album Supervisor: Humberto Gatica

References

External links
 

1985 debut albums
USA for Africa albums
Columbia Records albums
Albums produced by Quincy Jones
CBS Records albums